Kiyoaki is a masculine Japanese given name. Notable people with the name include:

Kiyoaki Hanai, Japanese racing driver
Kiyoaki Saibara (1884–1972), Japanese-born American farmer

Japanese masculine given names